Grande Cache Airport  was located  east of Grande Cache, Alberta, Canada.

References

External links

Defunct airports in Alberta
Municipal District of Greenview No. 16